Nguyễn Văn Phúc (born 6 October 1981) is a Vietnamese male paralympic powerlifter.

References

External links
IPC Profile
London 2012 Profile "van Phuc Nguyen"

1981 births
Living people
Paralympic powerlifters of Vietnam